The Ferrari Roma (Type F169) is an Italian grand touring car manufactured by Ferrari. It is a two-door hardtop coupé with a 2+2 seating arrangement.  It has a front mid-engine, rear-wheel-drive layout.
Based on the Ferrari Portofino, the car has a V8 engine with a turbocharger and is placed between the Portofino and the F8 Tributo in Ferrari's range of sports cars. The vehicle was named after Italy's capital city and was originally introduced online on November 13, 2019. Ferrari then unveiled the car the next day in Rome.

Design 

The exterior design was influenced by the Ferrari 250 GT Lusso and 250 GT 2+2 grand touring cars. The Roma's design features include flush door handles, slim LED lights at the front and rear, and an active rear spoiler that sits flush when the car is driven softly. The car's design won a Red Dot award.

The interior is focused on the dual cockpit theme, featuring separate driver and passenger cells. It is described as a "2+" interior by Ferrari with a small backseat area. The dashboard features digital instrumentation (a 16.0-inch wrap-around touch screen) and a multi-function steering wheel (both shared with the SF90 Stradale) for the driver. The trim piece running through the centre of the interior separates the driver and the passenger and is integrated seamlessly into the dashboard. A centrally-mounted 8.4-inch portrait touch screen controls most of the car's functions.  A third horizontal touchscreen can be integrated into the dashboard on the passenger side of the cockpit. This display allows the passenger access to the HVAC controls along with multimedia and navigation controls. The passenger can also view the performance metrics of the car. This third touchscreen emphasizes the passenger's role as navigator and co-pilot.  A newly designed key allows the driver to open the doors of the car by the push of a button near the flush door handles of the car.

Specifications and performance

Engine and transmission
The Roma is powered by the award-winning Ferrari type F154 engine.

The forced induction air intake system uses twin parallel water cooled turbochargers and two air-to-air intercoolers. The dry sump lubrication system helps prevent oil starvation during high g-force operation.

The engine is mated to the new 8-speed dual-clutch F1 transmission shared with the SF90 Stradale.  This new unit translates into more acceleration in the intermediate gears with an extended tall top gear for motorway cruising.  Ferrari says there is 15 percent more longitudinal pull in third gear when compared to the previous generation's 7-speed unit. The transaxle is equipped with an electronic differential and a mechanical reverse gear which contrasts to the SF90's electric motor reverse. This design weighs 6 kg (13 lb) less than the 7-speed unit used in the Portofino and is claimed to provide quicker and smoother shifting.  Much of the weight savings is due to the dry sump design and the primary alloy oil case that is compact and wrapped tightly around the various engine components.

Suspension
The double wishbone, coil spring design with anti-roll bars also has an optional MagneRide dynamic shock absorber system that provides more compact and controlled vehicle operation using magnetorheological dampers.

Electronics
The Roma comes standard with Ferrari's F1-Trac traction control, side-slip control 6.0 technology, electronic stability control (ESC), launch control (Power Start), and the Ferrari Dynamic Enhancer. It also has a five position Manettino dial on the steering wheel allowing selection of the vehicle's driving mode between wet, comfort, sport, race and ESC-off.

The Roma's electronic interior cockpit controls also represent a major deviation from recent Ferrari road cars.  The human-machine interface (HMI) is largely a digital touch-screen control system (using Haptic technology) that is also shared with the SF90 Stradale. The touch-screen control extends to some functions on the steering wheel.

Some driver assistance systems (ADAS) like front and rear radar with adaptive cruise control are also available options to aid during long drives.

Weight
The Roma was engineered to weigh  less than the Portofino while being based on the same platform.  This was achieved through a more rigid body structure and the overall use of lighter parts. Ferrari claims that 70 percent of the parts used on the Roma are new as compared to the Portofino. 
The published weight distribution is 50% front to 50% rear.

Aerodynamics
The dynamic rear wing self activates at high speed to help the vehicle generate downforce. The wing's three positions are low drag - flush (0-100 kph), medium downforce (100-300 kph), and high downforce (100-300 kph cornering and braking). The rear spoiler is complemented by a pair of underbody vortex generators that create ground effect and manage the wake of the front wheels to ensure efficient load management.

Wheels, tires and brakes
20 inch cast aluminium wheels are standard with 20 inch forged alloy wheels as an option.  Front wheel rims are eight inches wide and rear rims are ten inches.  The tires used on the Roma measure 285/35 ZR20s at the rear and 245/35 ZR20s at the front.  The model was introduced with the Ferrari-approved choice of Pirelli, Michelin, or Bridgestone run-flat tires.

The Roma has 390mm front and 360mm rear carbon-ceramic ventilated disc brakes.  The Ferrari Dynamic Enhancer controls yaw angle by actuating the individual brake calipers of the car, a first for a Ferrari GT model.

Exhaust system
A redesigned exhaust system uses particulate filters (similar to diesel particulate filters) for emissions regulation. This was achieved by removing the silencers (mufflers) and adding bypass valves.  It has been engineered to retain, enhance, and expand the engine's exhaust notes while reducing particle emissions.

Performance
The Roma's published top speed is > .  Performance figures include a 0- acceleration time of 3.4 seconds; and 0- acceleration time of 9.3 seconds. The Roma's dry weight to power ratio is a best in class 2.37 kg/cv (5.3 lb/hp).

Miscellaneous
The Roma's minimum height off the ground is a static 4 3/4 inches (120 mm).  Its maximum front ramp angle is 11 degrees and the maximum rear ramp angle is 15 1/2 degrees.

The vehicle comes with 10-cubic feet of boot space in the trunk and additional storage space behind the two front seats. An option of foldable back seat backrests expands the storage configuration to 14-cubic feet.  Keeping with the cars grand touring theme, and as with certain additional models, the Roma can be ordered with a specially designed, multi-piece luggage set which fits into the vehicle's rear trunk effectively.  The luggage matches the interior leather.

Market
The Roma was originally introduced with a base price of $218,670 (2020 USD).  Typical final build-out configurations could range from $270k to $310k and up.  Ferrari estimates 70 per cent of buyers would be first-time Ferrari customers.  They stated that the Roma is targeted squarely at the Porsche 911 and Aston Martin markets.  The overall design theme is "understated elegance" which is somewhat of a deviation from the traditional Ferrari road car.

Dedication and awards 
The Roma celebrated its public unveiling on November 14, 2019, during an international event at Rome's Stadio dei Marmi (Stadium of the Marbles).  In 2020 it made a guest appearance at the 150th anniversary of the declaration of Rome as the capital of a unified Italy.

The Ferrari Roma was awarded a Red Dot award in 2020 recognizing the cars inspirational design. The Red Dot awards aim at celebrating excellence and innovation in industrial design and recognizing the world's best designers.  Red Dot was quoted "by renouncing all superfluous details, the design of the Ferrari Roma achieves a formal minimalism that characterizes the timeless elegance of this sports car."

Auto&Design Magazine awarded the Roma the best production car design for 2020.  The panel of international auto journalists said the Roma reinterprets the classic lines of a Gran Turismo car and projects them into the 21st century with its sensual, evocative, and cutting-edge design.

The 2021 Esquire Car Awards named the Ferrari Roma as the Best Designed Car of the year.

References

External links 

 ferrari.com - Ferrari Roma
 ferrari.com - Ferrari Roma

Roma
Grand tourers
Coupés
Rear-wheel-drive vehicles
Front mid-engine, rear-wheel-drive vehicles
Cars introduced in 2019
2020s cars